"Arcade" is a song by Dutch singer-songwriter Duncan Laurence. The song was released on 7 March 2019 by Spark Records. It was later included as the lead single on his debut studio album Small Town Boy, and also features on his debut EP Worlds on Fire. The song was written by Laurence, Joel Sjöö, Wouter Hardy and Will Knox.

After the complete line-up of songs was announced, "Arcade" was the bookmakers' favourite to win Eurovision, and had remained so until the contest ended. An acoustic version of the song was released on 19 July 2019, followed by a duet version featuring American singer Fletcher on 27 November 2020. In February 2020, "Arcade" won an Edison Award for Best Pop Song of the Year.

In the second half of 2020, "Arcade" went viral on video sharing service TikTok, resulting in new chart successes and streams on various platforms.
In January 2021, "Arcade" became the most-streamed Eurovision song on Spotify, passing "Soldi" by Mahmood, the runner-up of Eurovision 2019. Later that year, in April, "Arcade" became the first Eurovision song in 25 years and the first Eurovision winning song in 45 years to chart on the US Billboard Hot 100; by September, it peaked at number 30.

In 2022, The Independent named "Arcade" the 30th best Eurovision-winning song of all time.

Background and composition
Laurence wrote the song while he attended the Tilburg Rock Academy. He worked on the song for over two years, predominantly while collaborating with Wouter Hardy, a former band member with Sharon Kovacs. The song is inspired by the heartbreak of a loved one of Duncan's who died. Laurence told WiwiBloggs, "Arcade is a story about the search for the love of your life. It's about the hope to reach something that seems unreachable". The namesake lyric "Small town boy in a big arcade" refers to his experience, being from a small town, as a Rock Academy freshman entering the summer fair of Tilburg, the largest in the Netherlands. Throughout the song, the fair and its arcade games are used as a metaphor for love, addiction and gambling with relationships.

"Arcade" is inspired by film soundtracks and consists of 165 tracks. The pop song opens with four chords played on piano, accompanied by a simple piano riff and overdubbed vocals. The triple metre verses contrast with the 4/4 time signature of the rest of the song, giving it a distinct sound. Heavy emphasis is put on Laurence's vocals. After the soft verses, in which he expresses his sadness and vulnerability, the chorus kicks in with heavy drums, accompanied with a choir of backing vocals, to enhance the lyrics' expressions of anger and frustration.

Eurovision Song Contest

Selection and reception
Ilse DeLange, runner-up of Eurovision 2014 as a member of The Common Linnets, came across Duncan in The Voice of Holland later that year, where she became his coach, and he regularly shared his songs with her since. DeLange sent one of those songs, "Arcade", to the Dutch Eurovision selection committee. Laurence was revealed as representative of the Netherlands in the Eurovision Song Contest 2019 on 21 January 2019, after "Arcade" was internally selected by the Dutch broadcaster. The song was never specifically written for Eurovision. Following the announcement, the selection committee received backlash from social media users, because of the decision to let an unknown artist represent the Netherlands in Eurovision, after previously sending unknown artists to the contest who usually achieved miserable results for the country.

After "Arcade" itself was revealed on 7 March 2019, the track received mostly positive reactions. The sound of "Arcade" has been compared to that of Coldplay. Peter Van de Veire, Belgium's Dutch-language Eurovision commentator, said that the gravity of the song's lyrics and composition would appeal to Eurovision viewers. Editors of the Eurovision fan site Wiwibloggs praised the emotional atmosphere of "Arcade" and gave the song an average score of 9.15 out of 10. Dan Niazi from ESCXtra, another Eurovision fan site, said he was not prepared for a song "as good and as perfectly produced as Arcade" to represent the Netherlands. He praised the song's composition and lyrical content, and thought the song had "the potential of changing the face of the contest for good", comparing the song to Loreen's "Euphoria", Sweden's 2012 entry. OGAE members placed the song third overall, behind Switzerland's and Italy's entries. Shortly after the release of "Arcade", the Netherlands became the leader of the betting odds; the Dutch broadcaster revealed they had a hosting plan on hand in case of a Dutch victory, written years beforehand, and The Hague had already applied a bid for hosting the following Eurovision, might Laurence take home the trophy, by April 2019.

In Eurovision
On 28 January 2019, an allocation draw was held, which placed each country into one of the two semi-finals, as well as which half of the show they would perform in. The Netherlands were placed into the second semi-final, held on 16 May 2019, and were scheduled to perform in the second half of the show. Once all the competing songs for the 2019 contest had been released, the running order for the semi-finals was decided by the show's producers rather than through another draw, so that similar songs were not placed next to each other. The Netherlands performed from starting position 16 and qualified for the final.

The performance of the song in Tel Aviv featured Laurence sitting behind an electric grand piano, with three backing vocalists supporting him offstage. DeLange and the Netherlands' creative team decided that Laurence should sit behind a piano on stage, because, him being a singer-songwriter, they wanted to portray him on stage as a musician. Surrounding Laurence and his piano, smoke, water and lighting effects, reminiscent of the official music video, accompanied the performance. Reactions to the simplistic performance were mixed. The Telegraphs Charlotte Runcie found that "the song deserves to do well, but the pared-back staging was in danger of being forgettable". Heidi Stephens, reporter for The Guardian, found the Dutch performance "bleak, but hauntingly beautiful". Writing for The Independent, Rob Holley found that "Arcade" was well performed, and although he feared that the performance was underwhelming for Eurovision standards, he thought the Netherlands were the biggest contenders for victory. The BBC's commentator for the semi-finals, Rylan Clark-Neal, put the Netherlands in his top five. During the Eurovision week, the Netherlands remained a favourite to win the competition, according to the bookmakers; shortly before the contest's final, their chances of winning were as high as 46 percent.

In the Grand Final, Laurence was drawn to perform in the first half of the show, in spot 12. Arcade received the maximum score of 12 points from six national juries, and twice from national audiences. The Netherlands finished third in the jury vote, behind North Macedonia and Sweden, and second in the televote, behind Norway, but ended up winning the Eurovision Song Contest with 492 points. After the Belarusian jury's results were revised, the final number of points was 498. It was the first Eurovision victory for the country since 1975, when Teach-In won for The Netherlands with "Ding-a-dong". Apart from winning the contest, "Arcade" also won the Marcel Bezençon Press Award. During his victory speech, the artist said: "This is to dreaming big; this is to music first, always."

Covers from other Eurovision acts
The song was featured three times in the Eurovision Home Concerts series, and covered by all the acts in Armenia's Depi Evratesil selection for the 2020 contest that would be cancelled in a group performance. The song was covered once again by Polish Junior Eurovision victors Roksana Węgiel and Viki Gabor, alongside a hologram image of Laurence as part of the interval act of the Junior Eurovision Song Contest 2020 which took place in Warsaw, Poland on 29 November 2020.

Commercial performance 
Following its Eurovision victory, "Arcade" reached the weekly charts of 26 European countries, peaking at number one in Belgium, Estonia, Iceland, Luxembourg and the Netherlands; it was subsequently certified quadruple platinum in the latter. Starting in late 2020, "Arcade" went viral on TikTok, resulting in renewed success on various weekly charts, including in the United States, where the song became a sleeper hit. It debuted at number 100 on the Billboard Hot 100 on 17 April 2021, and peaked at number 30 by 4 September.

In addition to its platinum certifications in the Netherlands, the song was also certified diamond in France, triple platinum in Poland, double platinum in Portugal, platinum in Australia, Austria, Belgium, Canada, Mexico and the United States, and gold in Denmark, Greece, Italy, Norway, Sweden and the United Kingdom.

On 18 May 2021, during the first semi-final of the Eurovision Song Contest 2021, Laurence received a Global Platinum certification for over one billion streams of "Arcade" worldwide. He was presented the award by 2021 Eurovision co-presenter Edsilia Rombley.

Track listing
 Digital single
 "Arcade" – 3:03

 Digital single – acoustic
 "Arcade" (acoustic version) – 3:19

 7-inch vinyl
 "Arcade" – 3:03
 "Arcade" (acoustic version) – 3:19

 Digital single – duet
 "Arcade" (featuring Fletcher) – 3:07

 Digital single – Sam Feldt remix
 "Arcade" (Sam Feldt remix) – 2:33

Charts

Weekly charts

Year-end charts

Certifications

Release history

References

External links
 

2019 singles
2019 songs
Duncan Laurence songs
Dutch Top 40 number-one singles
Eurovision songs of 2019
Eurovision Song Contest winning songs
Eurovision songs of the Netherlands
Number-one singles in Iceland
Songs written by Duncan Laurence
Songs written by Wouter Hardy